The 2016 Spanish general election was held on Sunday, 26 June 2016, to elect the 12th Cortes Generales of the Kingdom of Spain. All 350 seats in the Congress of Deputies were up for election, as well as 208 of 266 seats in the Senate.

No party had secured a majority in the 2015 election, resulting in the most fragmented parliament since 1977. Ensuing negotiations failed to produce a stable governing coalition, paving the way for a repeat election on 26 June. The political deadlock marked the first time that a Spanish election was triggered due to failure in the government formation process. Podemos and United Left (IU) joined forces ahead the election to form the Unidos Podemos alliance, along with several other minor left-wing parties. Opinion polling going into the election predicted a growing polarisation between this alliance and the People's Party (PP), which would be fighting to maintain first place nationally.

The Unidos Podemos alliance suffered a surprise decline in votes and vote share compared to the previous election, while the PP increased its number of votes and seats as well as its margin of victory. The Spanish Socialist Workers' Party (PSOE) clung to second place despite losing votes and seats, scoring a new historical low. Albert Rivera's Citizens (C's) suffered from the electoral system as well as from tactical voting to the PP and fell to 32 seats. Overall, a potential PP–C's bloc secured 6 more seats than before, but remained short of an overall majority. With the political deadlock settling in, commentators suggested that a new, third election could be eventually needed.

Electoral setbacks for the PSOE in the Basque and Galician regional elections held on 25 September 2016 unleashed a party crisis which led to Pedro Sánchez's ouster as leader on 1 October. An interim party leadership was appointed, which chose to abstain to allow government formation and prevent a third general election. As a result, Mariano Rajoy was re-elected as prime minister for a second term in office on 29 October amid public outcry and protest at PSOE's U-turn, which was also met with opposition from within the party—15 MPs eventually not complying with the party's directive and voting against Rajoy nonetheless. Rajoy's government would only last for 20 months until 2018, as public outcry at the emergence of new corruption scandals and judicial blows to the ruling party would prompt Sánchez—who would secure re-election as PSOE leader in June 2017—to bring down the PP government in the first successful motion of no confidence since the Spanish transition to democracy.

Overview

Electoral system
The Spanish Cortes Generales were envisaged as an imperfect bicameral system. The Congress of Deputies had greater legislative power than the Senate, having the ability to vote confidence in or withdraw it from a prime minister and to override Senate vetoes by an absolute majority of votes. Nonetheless, the Senate possessed a few exclusive (yet limited in number) functions—such as its role in constitutional amendment—which were not subject to the Congress' override. Voting for the Cortes Generales was on the basis of universal suffrage, which comprised all nationals over 18 years of age and in full enjoyment of their political rights. Additionally, Spaniards abroad were required to apply for voting before being permitted to vote, a system known as "begged" or expat vote.

For the Congress of Deputies, 348 seats were elected using the D'Hondt method and a closed list proportional representation, with an electoral threshold of three percent of valid votes—which included blank ballots—being applied in each constituency. Seats were allocated to constituencies, corresponding to the provinces of Spain, with each being allocated an initial minimum of two seats and the remaining 248 being distributed in proportion to their populations. Ceuta and Melilla were allocated the two remaining seats, which were elected using plurality voting. The use of the D'Hondt method might result in a higher effective threshold, depending on the district magnitude.

As a result of the aforementioned allocation, each Congress multi-member constituency was entitled the following seats:

For the Senate, 208 seats were elected using an open list partial block voting system, with electors voting for individual candidates instead of parties. In constituencies electing four seats, electors could vote for up to three candidates; in those with two or three seats, for up to two candidates; and for one candidate in single-member districts. Each of the 47 peninsular provinces was allocated four seats, whereas for insular provinces, such as the Balearic and Canary Islands, districts were the islands themselves, with the larger—Majorca, Gran Canaria and Tenerife—being allocated three seats each, and the smaller—Menorca, Ibiza–Formentera, Fuerteventura, La Gomera, El Hierro, Lanzarote and La Palma—one each. Ceuta and Melilla elected two seats each. Additionally, autonomous communities could appoint at least one senator each and were entitled to one additional senator per each million inhabitants.

Election date
The term of each chamber of the Cortes Generales—the Congress and the Senate—expired four years from the date of their previous election, unless they were dissolved earlier. The election decree was required to be issued no later than the twenty-fifth day prior to the date of expiry of the Cortes in the event that the prime minister did not make use of his prerogative of early dissolution. The decree was to be published on the following day in the Official State Gazette (BOE), with election day taking place on the fifty-fourth day from publication. The previous election was held on 20 December 2015, which meant that the legislature's term would expire on 20 December 2019. The election decree was required to be published in the BOE no later than 26 November 2019, with the election taking place on the fifty-fourth day from publication, setting the latest possible election date for the Cortes Generales on Sunday, 19 January 2020.

The prime minister had the prerogative to dissolve both chambers at any given time—either jointly or separately—and call a snap election, provided that no motion of no confidence was in process, no state of emergency was in force and that dissolution did not occur before one year had elapsed since the previous one. Additionally, both chambers were to be dissolved and a new election called if an investiture process failed to elect a prime minister within a two-month period from the first ballot. Barred this exception, there was no constitutional requirement for simultaneous elections for the Congress and the Senate. Still, as of  there has been no precedent of separate elections taking place under the 1978 Constitution.

Background

Election aftermath

The 2015 election resulted in the most fragmented Congress of Deputies in recent times. This raised the possibility that, for the first time since the Spanish transition to democracy, parliamentary deadlock over the investiture of a prime minister would require a new election to be held. According to Article 99.5 of the Spanish Constitution, "if within a period of two months from the first investiture vote no candidate has obtained the confidence of Congress, the King shall dissolve both chambers and call a new election, with the endorsement of the President of the Congress of Deputies."

A crisis developed within the PSOE after the December election result, with critics accusing Secretary-General Pedro Sánchez of lack of self-criticism ahead of PSOE's spring leadership election. While Sánchez favoured trying to reach an agreement with Podemos, regional party leaders refused to accept Podemos' negotiation terms and instead favoured allowing the PP to try to form a government on its own, and the possibility of a PSOE-Podemos pact faded. President of Andalusia Susana Díaz, who was reported to be leading an open rebellion within the party, was said to be seeking to replace Sánchez as party leader and to eventually lead the PSOE into a new general election in 2016.

As neither of the two possible pacts between the major parties (PP–C's or PSOE–Podemos) had enough deputies to command a majority on their own, attention focused on the PSOE as it underwent a leadership crisis. The PP wanted the Socialists to either abstain in Rajoy's investiture vote or join them in a grand coalition, C's put pressure on the PSOE to abstain and avoid a snap election, while Podemos suggested that Sánchez had lost control of his party. PSOE and C's feared that a new election could harm them and benefit both PP and Podemos.

PP scandals
A persistent wave of corruption scandals struck the PP throughout the negotiation process. On 22 January, the PP became the first party ever to be charged in a corruption case, after being accused of destroying Bárcenas' hard drives in 2013, which had allegedly contained information related to the party's illegal funding. The same day, a key member of Deputy PM Soraya Sáenz de Santamaría's staff was forced to resign from his post after it was discovered that he had been involved in a scandal involving the fraudulent awarding of public contracts.

"Operation Taula", a major police operation in Valencia that took place on 26 January 2016, resulted in the arrest of several former and incumbent high-ranking members of the regional PP branch, as part of the ongoing investigation into PP corruption in the region during its time in government. By early February, a massive illegal financing network had been uncovered connected with PPCV, with dozens of party officials and city councillors indicted or arrested. The judicial investigation also implicated long-serving former Mayor of Valencia Rita Barberá in the scandal; her arrest or indictment was only prevented due to the fact she had legal immunity as an incumbent senator. A few days later, on 1 February, all PP city councillors in the city of Valencia, including new local party leader Alfonso Novo, were charged with a possible money laundering offence, along with most members of Barberá's previous government. The party found itself at risk of losing its municipal group in the city of Valencia—the third largest in Spain, which had seen 24 years of PP rule under Barberá's command—and rumours circulating of a reformation of the party in the region.

On 11 February, the scandal spread to Madrid when the Civil Guard was sent to search PP's main headquarters as part of the ongoing investigation resulting from the Operation Punica scandal, uncovered in October 2014. Evidence suggested that the public work contract kickbacks from the Punica case could also involve possible illegal financing of the PP branch in the region. Esperanza Aguirre, former President of Madrid from 2003 to 2012 and president of the party's regional branch since 2004, resigned as regional leader on 14 February as a consequence of the scandal's political fallout, emphasising her lack of "direct responsibility" for the scandal but "assuming [her] political responsibility" both as party leader and former regional premier.

In April, an urban planning corruption scandal was revealed to involve Granada's mayor and his government, all from PP. Meanwhile, the Spanish Treasury fined former prime minister José María Aznar for evading tax payments through a society. On 15 April, caretaker Industry Minister José Manuel Soria stepped down from his post as a result of his involvement in the Panama Papers scandal and his confusing and inconsistent statements on the issue.

Economy
While negotiations to form a government were underway, Spain's public deficit for 2015 was announced as 5.2%, well above the 4.2% target agreed with the European Union and even exceeding the European Commission (EC) forecast of 4.8%. The International Monetary Fund (IMF) demanded that the large 2015 deficit translate into "substantial fiscal tightening", blaming the deficit on the PP government's 2015 decision to cut taxes for the election year. On 16 April, the government lowered its economic growth forecast for 2016 from 3% to 2.7%. As a result, Finance Minister Cristóbal Montoro announced €2 billion of spending cuts in order to curb the public deficit, while also demanding that the 12 autonomous communities agree their own austerity plans within 15 days to freeze public spending. Other economic data for the first quarter of 2016 showed the Spanish economy growing by 0.8% on the previous quarter, but with unemployment increasing slightly by 11,900, to 21%.

As a result of Spain not meeting its deficit target, the EC gave the country an additional year to meet its deficit requirements, but proposed a €2 billion fine, while demanding additional spending cuts worth €8 billion. Despite the government's denial that new cuts would be needed, a letter leaked on 23 May revealed that Rajoy would be willing to impose additional spending cuts "once a new government was formed" after 26 June election, sparking criticism from opposition parties, who accused the PP of lying to the public.

On 24 June, the IBEX 35—the benchmark stock market index of Spain's stock exchange—plummeted by 12.3%, the largest fall in its history, as a result of the 'Leave' choice winning in the 2016 United Kingdom European Union membership referendum.

Government formation failure

On 22 January, Mariano Rajoy turned down King Felipe VI's invitation to form a government after Podemos offered a coalition proposal to the PSOE, also including IU, with Sánchez as prime minister and Pablo Iglesias as his deputy. This offer shocked the PSOE—which suddenly found itself at the mercy of Iglesias' party—with prominent PSOE figures describing the proposal as an "insult" and "blackmail". The next day, Sánchez also declined to run for the investiture until Rajoy had clarified whether he would make his own attempt at government formation or step back definitely. Corruption scandals concerning the PP caused other parties to reject them and withdraw from negotiations with Rajoy. This situation lasted for a week until, on 2 February, the King invited Pedro Sánchez to form a government.

After several weeks of negotiations between parties, the PSOE announced a surprise government deal with C's on 24 February. However, the form and content of the agreement met with criticism from parties both on the left and right of the spectrum, including PP and Podemos. The PP stated its opposition to the PSOE–C's pact, refusing to cede to C's demands to abstain in the investiture on an agreement they described as "a farce". On the other hand, Podemos and other left-wing parties felt betrayed and broke off negotiations with PSOE, viewing the deal as an unholy alliance between the two formerly opposed parties. Other minor parties, such as the ERC, DL, PNV and EH Bildu, also announced their opposition. As a result, Pedro Sánchez's investiture was rejected on 4 March by an overwhelming majority of 219 to 131 in the Congress of Deputies, Sánchez thus becoming the first candidate ever to fail an investiture vote.

Negotiations continued throughout March and April, but antipathy between Podemos and C's made any three-party pact between PSOE, Podemos and C's impossible. The PP pressured the PSOE to join a grand coalition, a scenario which the latter rejected. A final round of talks on 25–26 April proved inconclusive, with King Felipe VI failing to nominate a candidate for prime minister. On 3 May 2016, the King exercised the constitutional mandate and triggered an election—with the endorsement of President of the Congress Patxi López—by issuing a royal decree dissolving the Parliament. This marked the first time since the transition to democracy that an election was called under Article 99.5 of the Constitution, wherein initiative for the Cortes' dissolution belonged to the King and not to the prime minister.

Parliamentary composition
The Cortes Generales were officially dissolved on 3 May 2016, after the publication of the dissolution decree in the Official State Gazette. The tables below show the composition of the parliamentary groups in both chambers at the time of dissolution.

Parties and candidates
The electoral law allowed for parties and federations registered in the interior ministry, coalitions and groupings of electors to present lists of candidates. Parties and federations intending to form a coalition ahead of an election were required to inform the relevant Electoral Commission within ten days of the election call, whereas groupings of electors needed to secure the signature of at least one percent of the electorate in the constituencies for which they sought election, disallowing electors from signing for more than one list of candidates. Concurrently, parties, federations or coalitions that had not obtained a mandate in either chamber of the Cortes at the preceding election were required to secure the signature of at least 0.1 percent of electors in the aforementioned constituencies.

Below is a list of the main parties and electoral alliances which contested the election:

In Asturias, Asturias Forum announced its intention to continue their electoral coalition with the People's Party, due to the PP–FAC tandem obtaining 3 out of the 8 seats at stake in the December election. Meanwhile, in Navarre, both Navarrese People's Union and PP were likely to maintain their alliance ahead of the upcoming general election, aiming at keeping their status as the first political force in the region. Izquierda-Ezkerra started talks with Podemos ahead of an alliance, whereas Geroa Bai and EH Bildu were open to "exploring" coalition possibilities after failing to make headway in the Congress in the region after the 2015 election. After Podemos and I-E rejected their offer of building a common platform, both parties studied the option of running together, but ended up discarding such a possibility. Both PSOE and NCa announced their intention of continuing their alliance in the Canary Islands, whereas the PP offered to maintain its alliance with PAR in Aragon.

CDC—which contested the 2015 election under the Democracy and Freedom (DL) banner—made an offer to ERC to resurrect the unitary coalition in which they both contested the 2015 Catalan regional election. Former Catalonia President Artur Mas offered himself to lead such a coalition into the election if it was eventually formed. ERC, however, rejected the offer and chose to run alone instead. Subsequently, debate arose within CDC on the opportunity to continue the DL alliance or to opt for alternative formulas to contest the election. Democrats of Catalonia and Reagrupament, CDC's allies within DL, suggested rebranding the alliance as "Together for Catalonia" (JxCat) and demanded it to be led by an independent. CDC leaders rejected this proposal and announced on 9 May that they were contesting the election on their own.

On 10 May, the newly formed Podemos-IU alliance offered a nationwide alliance with PSOE to contest the Senate election, in an effort to prevent a new PP absolute majority in that chamber. Pedro Sánchez rejected such a possibility as negotiations were already underway in Aragon, Balearic Islands and the Valencian Community. However, the party's Valencian branch, which advocated for an alliance with Compromís and Podemos for the Senate under the "Valencian Accord" label (In Valencian: Acord Valencià), refused to acknowledge Sánchez's command, threatening a schism in PSOE ranks as the party's national leadership tried to override their regional counterpart. After several days of conflict, the PSPV acquiesced to Sánchez's demand on 13 May, reluctantly rejecting the alliance with Compromís-Podemos.

Podemos aimed at enlarging its alliance system from December, seeking to conglomerate all forces to the left of PSOE in a single, unitary alliance for the 2016 election. Both En Comú Podem and En Marea had already announced their intention to continue their successful coalitions, while Compromís' leaders expressed their will to renew their alliance with Podemos but also seeking to include EUPV, which had been left out of the coalition for the previous election. Talks between Podemos and Més had also started in the Balearic Islands ahead of a prospective election alliance, aiming at forming a "grand coalition of the left" in the islands. Podemos tried to probe PACMA for a common nationwide list for the 2016 election, but this was rejected by the latter as it perceived that Podemos was "not clear enough on the issue of banning bullfighting".

Already from 20 April, both Podemos and IU-UPeC started exploring the possibility of forming a joint list for a likely fresh election. By 30 April, as the new election was confirmed, both parties acknowledged that talks had formally started and that an agreement was expected to be reached throughout the next week. On 9 May, Pablo Iglesias (Podemos) and Alberto Garzón (IU) officially announced that a formal alliance had been reached and that their parties would be running together in the upcoming general election. Equo, which had already supported the continuation of its coalition with Podemos, announced it would also participate in the newly formed alliance. The Podemos-IU national accord paved the way for United Left to join the És el moment alliance in the Valencian Community as well.

On 13 May, it was announced that the alliance name for the election would be "Unidos Podemos" (Spanish for United We Can).

Timetable
The key dates are listed below (all times are CET. Note that the Canary Islands use WET (UTC+0) instead):

3 May: The election decree is issued with the countersign of the President of the Congress of Deputies, ratified by the King. Formal dissolution of the Cortes Generales and official start of ban period for the organization of events for the inauguration of public works, services or projects.
6 May: Initial constitution of provincial and zone electoral commissions.
13 May: Deadline for parties and federations intending to enter in coalition to inform the relevant electoral commission.
23 May: Deadline for parties, federations, coalitions and groupings of electors to present lists of candidates to the relevant electoral commission.
25 May: Submitted lists of candidates are provisionally published in the Official State Gazette (BOE).
28 May: Deadline for citizens entered in the Register of Absent Electors Residing Abroad (CERA) and for citizens temporarily absent from Spain to apply for voting.
29 May: Deadline for parties, federations, coalitions and groupings of electors to rectify irregularities in their lists.
30 May: Official proclamation of valid submitted lists of candidates.
31 May: Proclaimed lists are published in the BOE.
10 June: Official start of electoral campaigning.
16 June: Deadline to apply for postal voting.
21 June: Official start of legal ban on electoral opinion polling publication, dissemination or reproduction and deadline for CERA citizens to vote by mail.
22 June: Deadline for postal and temporarily absent voters to issue their votes.
24 June: Last day of official electoral campaigning and deadline for CERA citizens to vote in a ballot box in the relevant consular office or division.
25 June: Official 24-hour ban on political campaigning prior to the general election (reflection day).
26 June: Polling day (polling stations open at 9 am and close at 8 pm or once voters present in a queue at/outside the polling station at 8 pm have cast their vote). Counting of votes starts immediately.
29 June: General counting of votes, including the counting of CERA votes.
2 July: Deadline for the general counting of votes to be carried out by the relevant electoral commission.
11 July: Deadline for elected members to be proclaimed by the relevant electoral commission.
21 July: Deadline for both chambers of the Cortes Generales to be re-assembled (the election decree determines this date, which for the 2016 election was set for 19 July).
20 August: Maximum deadline for definitive results to be published in the BOE.

Campaign

Campaign cost
One of the main themes going into the June election was the economic cost that a new campaign would mean for the budget. During the final round of talks, King Felipe VI—anticipating a fresh election—had asked parties to run austere campaigns.

The PP proposed that the party avoid large scale rallies, aiming at running a "simpler" campaign—with smaller events in medium-sized cities and towns—while also suggesting reducing the campaign's length to 10 days and removing external advertising—namely that involving advertising through billboards and flags. The PSOE suggested reducing campaign spending by 30%, cutting mailing spending and removing external advertising. Podemos and C's proposed unifying party mailing, with C's being favourable to cutting party spending by 50%. Podemos went further and suggested limiting parties' spending to 3 million each.

All three PSOE, Podemos and C's were against PP's proposal of making a shorter campaign or for cuts to affect election debates. As some of these proposals required changes in the electoral law—something which could not happen as the Cortes would be dissolved—parties called for reaching a gentlemen's agreement; in Albert Rivera's words, "a political pact through which changing the law wouldn't be necessary". However, negotiations held to discuss the reduction of electoral spending failed to produce an agreement, with parties expected to cut their spending at will.

Pre-campaign period
As parties geared up for the upcoming election campaign, the PP faced the fresh election looking back at the corruption scandals under judicial investigation in which the party was involved. Some of such scandals, involving senior party members such as Rita Barberá, stirred up debate as to whether it was best to maintain these people within party ranks or force their withdrawal. C's, on its part, discarded its pact with the PSOE after it was announced that a new election would be held, with party leaders stating that it "won't be in force anymore" once the Cortes were dissolved. However, they wanted to use the accord as a showing of the party's "willingness to negotiate" with forces both to the left and right of the spectrum. The party's main aim was to prevent that a possible campaign polarization could cast "fearful" voters away to the PP to prevent Podemos' rise. Albert Rivera said that the PP was "controlled by its 'old guard'" and that his party would not negotiate with the PP so long as Rajoy remained as leader.

The PSOE suffered from the end of the negotiations period. Carme Chacón—former Defence Minister under José Luis Rodríguez Zapatero—and Irene Lozano—an independent, formerly aligned to UPyD, personally enlisted into PSOE by Pedro Sánchez for the December election—both announced their withdrawal from PSOE lists ahead of the June election. Concurrently, PSOE leaders had tried to pressure IU into avoiding an electoral alliance with Podemos out of fear of being pushed into third place nationally, with some commenting that the party's actions had been erratic and confusing throughout negotiations. Coupled with growing pessimism within PSOE ranks, this was said to potentially be able to harm them going into the campaign. On 30 April, Sánchez tried to stir up morale among party members and asked for "unity and trust" around him ahead of the new election. Susana Díaz, Sánchez's rival for the party's leadership, warned him that she would only accept "a PSOE win". Once the hegemonic party of the Spanish left, the PSOE had been pushed out of the left and into the centre, with some fearing it could run down the path of the Greek PASOK.

As the newly formed Unidos Podemos alliance was announced on early May, the PSOE found itself under threat of being marginalised as both PP and UP sought to polarise the campaign between the two. Sánchez tried to remain in the spotlight and cast off the phantom of party internal division by releasing a series of key announcements throughout the first weeks of May. Margarita Robles—a judge from the Spanish Supreme Court and former Interior State Secretary under Felipe González—and Josep Borrell—former Public Works Minister—were announced to be signing up for Sánchez's campaign; concurrently, Susana Díaz accepted to officially present Sánchez's proclamation as PSOE candidate, in a move seen as an act of apparent "reconciliation" between the two leaders ahead of the election. Sánchez was also expected to announce his "shadow cabinet" on 15 May, and tried to appeal to centrist voters that a vote for him would be a "vote for change".

Pablo Iglesias blamed the PSOE for the failure in negotiations and commented that Podemos' aim in the June election would be to directly face the PP as equals, in what he referred to as a "second round" of the December run. Iglesias offered to explore the possibility of an accord with PSOE after the election, expressing his will to form a "progressive" government, but condemned the way the PSOE had—in his view—treated his party up until that point. During an interview held a few days later, Iglesias took for granted that his party had already surpassed the PSOE nationally and stated he would offer Sánchez be his deputy in a Podemos-led cabinet. Once his electoral coalition with IU had been formalized, Iglesias again reiterated his wish to see the PSOE "as an ally"—despite the Socialists having rejected Podemos' offer for an alliance to the Senate—and put overtaking the PP as his target.

For the first time since 2011, the anniversary of the 15-M Movement came marked by the pre-electoral campaign of a general election. UP, self-declared as the Movement's political heir, intended to use the event as a launching point for its campaign. Various nods to 15-M were made: the announcement of the Podemos–IU alliance was staged on 9 May at Puerta del Sol, long-regarded as a symbol and focal point for 15-M. Concurrently, Podemos launched an "accountability" campaign under the 'Congress in your square' label "to regain the connection with the streets". On 15 May, thousands gathered at Puerta del Sol to commemorate the 15-M anniversary; the crowd shouting some of the Movement's most featured slogans, such as the "Yes we can!" warcry—which had also served as Podemos' party slogan ever since its inception.

As UP struggled to gain momentum, PP, PSOE and C's turned their attacks on the newborn alliance, trying to corner it to the far-left side of the spectrum. Andalusian President Susana Díaz said of it that it was "the reunion of the Communist Youth"; the PP described it as "the old-fashioned communists but with another name". C's leader Albert Rivera commented that his party offered itself "without sickles, hammers nor corruption", in reference both to UP and the PP.

Party slogans

Election debates
After the success of election debates in the 2015 election, the organizing of new debates for the incoming campaign started after the Cortes' dissolution. As in the previous election, the first debate was organised by the Demos Association, to be held in the Charles III University of Madrid on 6 June. The leaders of the four main parties were invited, with Pablo Iglesias and Albert Rivera confirming their presence but making it conditional on Rajoy and Sánchez attending as well. Atresmedia also announced the group's intention to have a four-way debate, scheduled for 16 June, similar to the one held on 7 December. This time, Mariano Rajoy was willing to attend a four-way leaders' debate—unlike the previous election campaign, in which his party sent Soraya Sáenz de Santamaría instead. The PP was, however, unconvinced of holding another two-way debate with Pedro Sánchez, with Rajoy displeased with the format of 14 December debate—allegedly after a harsh confrontation with Sánchez following the latter referring to Rajoy as "indecent".

The PSOE announced that Sánchez would not attend a debate with Iglesias and Rivera if Rajoy was not present as well. C's made Rivera's presence conditional on either Rajoy attending or having an empty lectern put in his place, but would not accept the PP sending another person instead. Podemos did not take a firm stance on the issue but Íñigo Errejón stated that his party would "go to all debates, always sending spokespeople at the same level as those sent by other political forces", thus opening the door for Iglesias not attending debates if other parties did not send their prime ministerial candidates.

As neither Rajoy nor Sánchez confirmed their presence at the Charles III debate, the Demos Association announced its cancellation on 30 May. A four-way debate was announced to be held on 13 June to be organised by the TV Academy. All four main parties confirmed their presence, with the novelty that Rajoy accepted an invitation to attend as well. Unlike the previous campaign, the PP rejected a two-way debate between Rajoy and Sánchez, on grounds that, according to opinion polls, if a two-way debate was held "it was doubtful which party was to face Rajoy"—in reference to Unidos Podemos having overtaken the PSOE in opinion polling ahead of the election.

Pablo Iglesias and Albert Rivera staged a two-on-two debate in the Salvados news show hosted by Jordi Évole. The debate was not broadcast live, but rather recorded on 28 May and intentionally delayed until 5 June. Évole had stated that the debate had been "specially harsh" between both candidates in comparison to previous similar events, and that C's had put a series of conditions in order to accept bringing Rivera to the debate.

Opinion polls

Other issues
Following the result of the Brexit vote three days before the election in Spain, the PP issued a statement saying the country needed "stability" in the face of "radicalism" and "populism." It was also read as an attack on the Unidos Podemos coalition that vowed to fight for the least well-off. Iglesias said that Europe had to "change course. No-one would want to leave Europe if it were fair and united."

Opinion polls

Results

Congress of Deputies

Senate

Elected members

Outcome
The People's Party (PP) emerged as the largest party, securing the most seats—137—but just as in the previous election, failed to obtain an overall majority. The Spanish Socialist Workers' Party (PSOE) clung on to second place but fell to a new record low of 85, whereas Unidos Podemos, the alliance between Podemos and United Left (IU) remained at third place with 71 seats. The PP increased its seat count by a surprising 14, capitalising on losses by both PSOE and liberal Citizens (C's). Unidos Podemos' second placed projection failed to materialise at the polls, although they maintained the same number of seats as in the previous election. Overall, the parliamentary deadlock remained, as neither bloc could gather an absolute majority of seats. However, the PP–C's bloc gained strength, climbing from 163 to 169, whereas the PSOE–Podemos–IU bloc was reduced from 161 to 156. The attempted PSOE–C's pact was reduced to 117 seats, now outnumbered by the PP alone.

Regionally, the PP swept all the autonomous communities except for Catalonia and the Basque Country, where Unidos Podemos retained first place. The PSOE, which had narrowly won in its strongholds of Andalusia and Extremadura in the 2015 election, was pushed to second place in both of them, being unable to retain first place in any region only for the second time in democracy (the first being in 2011). Nonetheless, it recovered slightly on some of the regions where it performed the worst in December 2015, with notable advances in Madrid, Valencian Community, Navarre, Asturias, Galicia and the Canary Islands. However, this contrasted with setbacks in the party's own strongholds of Andalusia, Extremadura and Castile-La Mancha. The Unidos Podemos alliance only managed to improve on the 2015 combined results of Podemos and IU in the Basque Country and Navarre, suffering losses everywhere else.

In Catalonia, the Republican Left–Catalonia Yes coalition (ERC–CatSí) saw gains at the expense of Democratic Convergence of Catalonia (CDC), which lost both Girona and Lleida which the Democracy and Freedom coalition had won in 2015. This marked the first time in democracy that ERC managed to come out on top in any province in a general election. The Basque Nationalist Party (PNV) lost in Biscay only for the second time since the return of democracy, which cost them the loss of the province's 3rd seat to Unidos Podemos.

Failure in opinion polling was largely attributed to the sudden abstention of roughly 1 million Podemos' voters from December 2015, unsure of their party's chances of ruling after the election and partially disenchanted with politics at large after the failed negotiations in forming a government throughout the previous six months. At the same time, the PP result was attributed to a last-hour surge motivated by centre-right tactical voting against Pablo Iglesias, influenced by Unidos Podemos' strong showing in opinion polls. Voter turnout was a record low 66.5%, exceeding the previous lowest ever recorded turnout of 68.0% at the 1979 election. Of the four main parties, all except for the PP attracted fewer total votes than in 2015. The PSOE lost about 100,000 votes, the Unidos Podemos alliance 1,080,000 and C's 370,000. The PP received about 700,000 more votes.

Aftermath

Government formation

On 29 October, Mariano Rajoy succeeded in his investiture attempt with the support of 170 MPs to 111 against and 68 abstentions.

2017 motion of no confidence

On 14 June 2017, a motion of no confidence in the government of Mariano Rajoy tabled by Unidos Podemos after a string of corruption scandals involving the ruling People's Party was defeated 170 to 82, with the main opposition Spanish Socialist Workers' Party abstaining.

2018 motion of no confidence

A motion of no confidence in the Spanish government of Mariano Rajoy was held between 31 May and 1 June 2018. The motion was registered by the Spanish Socialist Workers' Party (PSOE) on 25 May after the ruling People's Party (PP) was found to have profited from the illegal kickbacks-for-contracts scheme of the Gürtel case. The motion was successful and resulted in Mariano Rajoy being replaced by PSOE leader Pedro Sánchez as prime minister.

Notes

References

External links

General
2016 in Spain
2016
June 2016 events in Spain